Charles Lennox, 1st Duke of Richmond, 1st Duke of Lennox,  (29 July 167227 May 1723), of Goodwood House near Chichester in Sussex, was the youngest of the seven illegitimate sons of King Charles II, and was that king's only son by his French-born mistress Louise de Kérouaille, Duchess of Portsmouth. He was appointed Hereditary Constable of Inverness Castle.

Titles
Various titles became eligible for re-grant following the death in 1672 of King Charles II's childless 4th cousin (both being descended in the male line from John Stewart, 3rd Earl of Lennox, the paternal grandfather of Henry Stewart, Lord Darnley, father of King James I of England) Charles Stewart, 3rd Duke of Richmond, 6th Duke of Lennox (1639–1672), KG, 12th Seigneur d'Aubigny in France, of Cobham Hall in Kent and of Richmond House in Whitehall, London. This Anglicised branch of the Scottish family of "Stewart of Darnley" had been much beloved and promoted by King James I & VI, whose favourite had been the Franco-Scottish Esmé Stewart, 1st Duke of Lennox, 1st Earl of Lennox (1542–1583), 7th Seigneur d'Aubigny, his father's first cousin (and great-grandfather of the last in the male line Charles Stewart, 3rd Duke of Richmond, 6th Duke of Lennox). Thus the Lennox and Richmond titles and the French Seigneurie d'Aubigny (effectively the lordship of the manor of the Château d'Aubigny in Aubigny-sur-Nère) held special significance for the Stuart monarchs. Moreover, the title Earl of Richmond had merged into the crown on the accession to the throne in 1485 of King Henry VII, formerly Earl of Richmond, and the Scottish title Earl of Lennox had merged into the crown of Great Britain, as King James I of England and VI of Scotland was effectively the 5th Earl of Lennox, being the heir of his paternal grandfather Matthew Stewart, 4th Earl of Lennox.

On 9 August 1675, King Charles II's illegitimate son (by Louise de Kérouaille) who had been given the surname "Lennox", was created Duke of Richmond, Earl of March, and Baron Settrington in the Peerage of England and on 9 September 1675, was created Duke of Lennox, Earl of Darnley, and Baron Methuen of Torbolten in the Peerage of Scotland. He was invested as a Knight of the Garter on 18 April 1681. In 1684, at the request of King Charles II, the French King Louis XIV created Louise de Kérouaille "Duchesse d'Aubigny" in the Peerage of France, with remainder to her descendants. As the 1st Duke predeceased his mother, he never held the French dukedom, which was however inherited by his son, the duchess's grandson. He was appointed Lord High Admiral of Scotland, under reservation of the commission granted to James, Duke of Albany and York (later James VII), as Lord High Admiral for life. The appointment was therefore only effective between 1701 and 1705, when Lennox resigned all of his Scottish lands and offices.

He was Master of a Lodge in Chichester in 1696, and so was one of the few known seventeenth-century freemasons. His son followed him into the Freemasons.

Marriage and issue
On 8 January 1692 he married Anne Brudenell (d. 9 December 1722), a daughter of Francis Brudenell, Lord Brudenell (d. 1698), eldest son and heir apparent of Robert Brudenell, 2nd Earl of Cardigan. By his wife he had issue one son and two daughters: 
Charles Lennox, 2nd Duke of Richmond, 2nd Duke of Lennox, 2nd Duc d'Aubigny (1701–1750), son and heir, known during his father's lifetime by the courtesy title of Earl of March; 
Lady Louisa Lennox (Countess of Berkeley), who married James Berkeley, 3rd Earl of Berkeley; 
Lady Anne Lennox (Countess of Albemarle), who married Willem van Keppel, 2nd Earl of Albemarle.

By his mistress Jacqueline de Mézières he had a daughter, Renée Lennox (1709–1774), mistress of her half-first-cousin Charles Beauclerk, 2nd Duke of St Albans, the son and heir of the sixth illegitimate son of King Charles II (by his mistress Nell Gwyn).

Patron of cricket
He was a patron of the game of cricket, then becoming a leading professional sport, and did much to develop it in Sussex. It is almost certain that he was involved with the earliest known "great match", which took place in the 1697 season and was the first to be reported by the press. The report was in the Foreign Post dated Wednesday, 7 July 1697:

"The middle of last week a great match at cricket was played in Sussex; there were eleven of a side, and they played for fifty guineas apiece".

The stakes on offer confirm the importance of the fixture and the fact that it was eleven-a-side suggests that two strong and well-balanced teams were assembled. No other details were given but the report provides evidence that cricket, in the form of "great matches" played for high stakes, was in vogue at the time. It was possibly an inter-county match: i.e., a Sussex XI versus a Kent XI or a Surrey XI. Richmond sponsored a team in the 1702 season against an Arundel side. His son Charles Lennox, 2nd Duke of Richmond inherited his interest in cricket and became the patron of both Sussex county cricket teams and Slindon Cricket Club.

Death and burial
He died on 27 May 1723 and was buried on 7 June 1723 in the Richmond Chapel (Henry VII Chapel) of Westminster Abbey, which chapel had been built by King Henry VII, formerly Earl of Richmond. His body was reinterred on 16 August 1750 in the Lady Chapel of Chichester Cathedral in Sussex.

Legacy
Richmond County, New York (coextensive with Staten Island), and Richmond County, Virginia, were named after Charles Lennox, whilst other US counties called "Richmond" were named after later Dukes.

References

Bibliography

Further reading
 Late Baron di Bauvso, Malta. 1 January 2000.
 The Adami Collection – collection of Parish records of Marriages, legacy and nobility, National Library of Malta, vol 10, pp 1838.

|-

1672 births
1723 deaths
17th-century English nobility
18th-century English people
English cricket in the 14th to 17th centuries
Charles
301
201
Dukes of Aubigny
Charles
Knights of the Garter
Lord Chamberlains of Scotland
English people of French descent
Illegitimate children of Charles II of England
Members of the Privy Council of Ireland
Members of the Kit-Kat Club
Burials at Chichester Cathedral
Cricket patrons
17th-century Scottish peers
Peers of England created by Charles II
Peers of Scotland created by Charles II
Sons of kings